Benjamin Robert Hawes  (born 28 July 1980) is a former English field hockey player, a 3x Olympian who played for the English and the British national team in midfield or as a halfback.

Hawes competed for England and Great Britain at numerous tournaments, and has represented Great Britain in Field hockey at the 2004, 2008 (as captain) and 2012 Summer Olympics. He had 132 caps representing England and 99 caps representing Great Britain (231 International Caps) before he announced his retirement from international hockey in 2013. He currently is the coach of the Wimbledon's men's team, having previously played for them, Surbiton and Amsterdam.

He was named Chairman of the British Olympic Association (BOA) Athletes' Commission in 2015, representing British Olympic Athletes on the BOA Board, after serving on the commission for 4 years.

Hawes was appointed Member of the Order of the British Empire (MBE) in the 2022 Birthday Honours for services to sport.

References

External links
 
 
 
 
 Team GB profile: Nem Hawes at Telegraph.co.uk
 EHL Statistics at FixturesLive.com

1980 births
Living people
Sportspeople from Brighton
English male field hockey players
Olympic field hockey players of Great Britain
British male field hockey players
Male field hockey midfielders
Male field hockey defenders
English field hockey coaches
Field hockey players at the 2004 Summer Olympics
Field hockey players at the 2006 Commonwealth Games
2006 Men's Hockey World Cup players
Field hockey players at the 2008 Summer Olympics
2010 Men's Hockey World Cup players
Field hockey players at the 2012 Summer Olympics
Surbiton Hockey Club players
Amsterdamsche Hockey & Bandy Club players
Wimbledon Hockey Club players
Commonwealth Games competitors for England
Members of the Order of the British Empire